Genota mitriformis, common name the mitre-shaped turrid, is a species of sea snail, a marine gastropod mollusk in the family Borsoniidae.

Description
The length of the shell varies between 30 mm and 55 mm. The periphery is noduled. Above it the shoulder is sloping, slightly concave, with revolving lines, lightly marked. Below the periphery it is decussated by close revolving and somewhat curved growth lines. The color of the shell is yellowish or orange-brown.

Distribution
This marine species occurs in the Atlantic Ocean off Angola and West Africa (Gambia, Mauritania and Ivory Coast)

References

 Gofas, S.; Afonso, J.P.; Brandào, M. (Ed.). (S.a.). Conchas e Moluscos de Angola = Coquillages et Mollusques d'Angola. [Shells and molluscs of Angola]. Universidade Agostinho / Elf Aquitaine Angola: Angola. 140 pp.

External links
 Wood, W. (1828). Supplement to the Index Testaceologicus; or A catalogue of Shells, British and Foreign. Richard Taylor, London. Iv [+1 + 59 pp., plates 1-8]
 Sykes E.R. (1905). Descriptions of new forms of Marginellidae and Pleurotomidae. Proceedings of the Malacological Society of London 6(6): 315-318, pl. 17.
 

mitriformis
Gastropods described in 1828